Wizz Air Malta is a Maltese low-cost airline and a subsidiary of the Hungarian Wizz Air. The company operated its first flight on 27 September 2022 from Rome Fiumicino to Malta International Airport. It is flying with Maltese-registered aircraft, following in the footsteps of Wizz’s other subsidiaries in Abu Dhabi and the UK.

The company's Air Operator Certificate was issued by the European Union Aviation Safety Agency (EASA) and its Operating Licence by the Malta Civil Aviation Directorate.

On the 15th of August 2022 the company named former Ryanair executive Diarmuid O Conghaile to be its managing director starting from 1 November 2022.

Fleet 

The first aircraft in the Airline's fleet was an Airbus A321neo with the registration: 9H-WAM. The aircraft first was delivered to Wizz Air Hungary in May 2021 and was formerly registered as HA-LVS. Wizz Air plans to place up to 78 aircraft with its new Maltese entity by the summer of 2023, which will either be new deliveries or reregistered Wizz Air Hungary aircraft.

As of February 2023, the Wizz Air Malta fleet consists of the following aircraft:

References

External links

Airlines of Malta
Airlines established in 2022
Low-cost carriers
2022 establishments in Malta